Echo I or Echo 1 or variant, may refer to:

 Echo I-class submarine of the Soviet Navy
 Echo 1, a 1960 NASA Project Echo passive communications satellite that failed to make it to space
 Echo 1A, a 1960 NASA Project Echo passive communications satellite that was NASA's first comm satellite, thus also referred to as "Echo 1"

See also
 EchoStar I, a 1990s communications satellite
 Echo (disambiguation)